Paul French (died 1 November 1600) was a Canon of Windsor from 1560 to 1600.

Career

He was educated at All Souls College, Oxford and graduated BA in 1542, and MA in 1545.

He was appointed:
Rector of Little Wittenham, Berkshire 1552
Rector of Boyton, Wiltshire 1565
Prebendary of Canterbury Cathedral 1566–1600
Prebendary of Milton Manor in Lincoln Cathedral 1588–1600

He was appointed to the second stall in St George's Chapel, Windsor Castle in 1560, and held the stall until 1600.

Notes 

1600 deaths
Canons of Windsor
Alumni of All Souls College, Oxford
Year of birth missing